Gumniska may refer to the following places in Poland:
Gumniska, a district of Tarnów
Gumniska, Subcarpathian Voivodeship (south-east Poland)
Gumniska, Warmian-Masurian Voivodeship (north-east Poland)